The 1949 college football season finished with four teams that were unbeaten and untied-- Notre Dame, Oklahoma, California, and Army had won all their games at season's end.  Notre Dame, however, was the overwhelming choice for national champion in the AP Poll, with 172 of 208 first place votes. The Fighting Irish did not participate in the New Year's Day bowl games, which were played on January 2, 1950.

Conference and program changes

Conference changes
Two new conferences began play in 1949:
Gulf Coast Conference – active through the 1956 season; formed by former members of the Lone Star Conference
Upper Peninsula Conference – football active through the 1950 season; formed by junior colleges and independents in the Upper Peninsula, Michigan and northern Wisconsin

Membership changes

September
The Associated Press did not poll the writers until the third week of the season.  Among the five teams that had been ranked highest in 1948, California was the first to open play, with a 21–7 win over Santa Clara on September 17.

By September 24, most teams were in action.  Defending champion Michigan beat visiting Michigan State, 7–3.  Notre Dame beat Indiana 49–6.  North Carolina beat N.C. State 26–6.  California beat St. Mary's 29–7.  The night before, Oklahoma had won at Boston College, 46–0.

October
On October 1 in Seattle, Notre Dame beat Washington 27–7.  Oklahoma beat Texas A&M 33–13, North Carolina beat Georgia 21–14, and Michigan won at Stanford, 27–7.  
When the first poll was issued, Michigan had 34 of the 80 votes cast, followed by Notre Dame and Oklahoma.  Tulane University, which had beaten Alabama 28–14 and Georgia Tech 18–0, placed fourth.  Minnesota, which had victories over Washington (48–20) and at Nebraska (28–6) was fifth.  North Carolina, which had been in the final top five in 1948, was at sixth place.

October 8 No. 1 Michigan was beaten at home by No. 7 Army.  No. 2 Notre Dame won at Purdue 35–12.  No. 3 Oklahoma beat No. 12 Texas in Dallas, 20–14.  No. 4 Tulane beat Southeastern Louisiana 40–0.  No. 5 Minnesota beat No. 20 Northwestern 21–7. The next poll elevated Notre Dame to No. 1 and Army to No. 2, followed by Oklahoma, Tulane, and Minnesota.

October 15  In South Bend, No. 1 Notre Dame beat No. 4 Tulane 46–7.
No. 2 Army won at Harvard, 54–14.
No. 3 Oklahoma beat Kansas 48–26.  
No. 5 Minnesota stayed unbeaten with a win in Columbus over No. 11 Ohio State, 27–0. The next poll featured No. 1 Notre Dame, No. 2 Army, No. 3 Minnesota, and No. 4 Oklahoma. California, which beat No. 12 USC 16–10, moved up from No. 9 to No. 5.

October 22 No. 1 Notre Dame was idle.  No. 2 Army beat Columbia 63–6.  No. 3 Minnesota lost at No. 12 Michigan, 14–7.
No. 4 Oklahoma won at Nebraska 48–0.  No. 5 California beat Washington 21–7.  No. 9 Rice won at No. 10 Texas, 17–15, and was fifth in the next poll behind Notre Dame, Army, Oklahoma, and California.
 
October 29  
In Baltimore, No. 1 Notre Dame defeated Navy, 40–0.  No. 2 Army defeated VMI (the Virginia Military Institute) 40–14.  No. 3 Oklahoma beat Iowa State 34–7.  In Los Angeles, No. 4 California beat No. 20 UCLA 35–21.  No. 5 Rice beat Texas Tech 28–0 to extend its record to 5–1–0.  No. 6 Michigan, which won at Illinois 13–0, returned to the Top Five with a 4–2–0 record, moving up ahead of Rice.

November
November 5
No. 1 Notre Dame won at No. 10 Michigan State, 34–21.  No. 2 Army defeated No. 20 Fordham, 35–0.  No. 3 Oklahoma won at Kansas State 39–0.  No. 4 California beat Washington State 33–14.  No. 5 Michigan beat Purdue 20–12.  The top five stayed unchanged.

November 12  At Yankee Stadium, No. 1 Notre Dame beat North Carolina, 42–6.  No. 2 Army had a scare in Philadelphia, edging Penn 14–13.  
No. 3 Oklahoma won at Missouri, 27–7.  No. 4 California beat Oregon 41–14.  No. 5 Michigan beat Indiana 20–7. The next poll moved Oklahoma to No. 2 and California to No. 3, with Army dropping to fourth.

November 19   No. 1 Notre Dame defeated Iowa 28–7.  No. 2 Oklahoma beat Santa Clara 28–21.  No. 3 California defeated No. 12 Stanford 33–14 to finish its season unbeaten.  No. 4 Army was idle as it prepared for the Army–Navy Game.  No. 5 Michigan was tied by No. 7 Ohio State, 7–7. The next Top Five was No. 1 Notre Dame, No. 2 California, No. 3 Oklahoma, No. 4 Army, and No. 5 Ohio State.

November 26  No. 1 Notre Dame defeated visiting No. 17 USC, 32–0.
No. 3 Oklahoma beat Oklahoma State 41–0.  No. 4 Army returned to Philadelphia for the Army–Navy Game and defeated Navy 38–0. No. 7 Rice beat No. 9 Baylor 21-7.  No. 2 California at 10–0–0, and No. 5 Ohio State, at 6–1–2, accepted bids to play in the Rose Bowl.

The final poll was released on November 28, although some colleges had not completed their schedules; the top five were No. 1 Notre Dame, No. 2 Oklahoma, No. 3 California, No. 4 Army, and No. 5 Rice.  On December 3, the national champs, No. 1 Notre Dame closed a perfect season in Dallas with a 27–20 win over Southern Methodist University (SMU).

Conference standings

Major conference standings

Independents

Minor conferences

Minor conference standings

Rankings

Bowl games

Heisman Trophy voting
The Heisman Trophy is given to the year's most outstanding player

Source:

See also
 1949 College Football All-America Team

References